Smiley Mountain is a  peak in Custer County, Idaho, USA, and one of the higher points in the Pioneer Mountains.

See also
List of mountain peaks of Idaho

References

Mountains of Custer County, Idaho
North American 3000 m summits